Uzlah (plural Uzaal ; Arabic: عزل) is the name given to Yemen's regional administrative divisions. The 'uzlah was originally a sub-division of a mikhlaf, another type of administrative division. However, the mikhleef system is no longer used by the government so it is now an administrative sub-division of a district.

Etymology 
In Arabic, the word 'uzlah means remoteness or loneliness.

References 

Ancient history of Yemen
Palaces in Yemen
Geography of Yemen
Types of administrative division